HMS Ethalion was a Royal Navy 36-gun frigate, launched in 1802 at Woolwich Dockyard. She was eventually broken up in 1877.

Service

Ethalion entered service in 1803 under Captain Charles Stuart, operating in the North Sea. In 1807, command passed to William Charles Fahie, who took Ethalion to the West Indies.

In December 1807 Ethalion was part of the squadron under Admiral Sir Alexander Cochrane that captured the Danish islands of St Thomas on 22 December and Santa Cruz on 25 December. The Danes did not resist and the invasion was bloodless. 

On 26 October 1808 Ethalion captured Washington.

Ethalion also participated in the invasion of Martinique in 1809 under Captain Thomas John Cochrane.

In April 1809, a strong French squadron arrived at the Îles des Saintes, south of Guadeloupe. Ethalion played a distant part in the Action of 14–17 April 1809.

Even so, she was among the naval vessels that shared in the proceeds of the capture of the islands.

In 1810, Ethalion briefly paid off, before returning to service in 1811 off Lisbon under Captain Heywood and then in the Baltic Sea. On 12 April 1812, Ethalion and  captured the Opsloe.

Shortly after the outbreak of the War of 1812, on 12 August, Ethalion shared in the seizure of several American vessels: Cuba, Caliban, Edward, Galen, Halcyon, and Cygnet.

Ethalion escorted a convoy from the St Lawrence River on 12 November 1813, but bad weather dispersed the vessels. She recaptured the Pomona (or Pomone), of Teignmouth, on 14 December off the coast of Ireland. Pomona had been a prize to the American privateer Prince de Neufchatel.

In 1814 Ethalion was operating under Captain William Hugh Dobbie off the Irish Coast and in 1816 was placed in reserve at Woolwich.

Fate

In 1823 Ethalion was converted to a hospital ship, which she remained as until becoming a breakwater in the 1860s. She was eventually broken up in 1877.

Notes, citations, and references
Notes

Citations

References
 Ships of the Old Navy

1802 ships
Ships built in Woolwich
Frigates of the Royal Navy
Ships sunk as breakwaters